Basil Owen Plummer (20 March 1900 – 3 February 1968) was an Australian politician. He was born at Pokesdown, Bournemouth in England. In 1937 he was elected to the Tasmanian House of Assembly as a Labor member for Franklin, serving until his defeat in 1941. He died at Hobart in 1968.

References

1900 births
1968 deaths
Members of the Tasmanian House of Assembly
English emigrants to Australia
Australian Labor Party members of the Parliament of Tasmania
20th-century Australian politicians